Leonardo Ezequiel Carboni (born November 4, 1984) is an Argentine footballer who plays as a striker for Bruno's Magpies in the Gibraltar National League.

Career
Carboni played a vital role in Nueva Chicago during the 2011–12 season of Primera B Metropolitana scoring 15 goals and helping his team to achieve the promotion to the Primera B Nacional.

In July 2012, he signed a new deal with Uruguayan Primera División side Danubio F.C. He scored his first goal in the club on 7 August 2012, in a 2–1 away loss in the 2012 Copa Sudamericana against Olimpia. Carboni missed several matches through suspension and injury but led the club in goals.

References

External links
 Profile at Soccerway
 Profile at BDFA

1984 births
Living people
Argentine footballers
Argentine expatriate footballers
Association football forwards
Uruguayan Primera División players
Quilmes Atlético Club footballers
Club Atlético Brown footballers
Estudiantes de Buenos Aires footballers
Nueva Chicago footballers
Danubio F.C. players
Independiente Rivadavia footballers
Estudiantes de Río Cuarto footballers
Atlético Venezuela C.F. players
Universitario de Sucre footballers
Villa Dálmine footballers
Talleres de Remedios de Escalada footballers
Mons Calpe S.C. players
St Joseph's F.C. players
F.C. Bruno's Magpies players
Argentine expatriate sportspeople in Uruguay
Argentine expatriate sportspeople in Venezuela
Argentine expatriate sportspeople in Bolivia
Argentine expatriate sportspeople in Gibraltar
Expatriate footballers in Uruguay
Expatriate footballers in Venezuela
Expatriate footballers in Bolivia
Expatriate footballers in Gibraltar
Gibraltar National League players
Footballers from Córdoba, Argentina